Sri Venkateswara Bala Kuteer (SVBK) is a private school located in Guntur, Andhra Pradesh, India. It was established in 1965 by Dr Nannapaneni Manga Devi and Ms Garige Prabhavathi.

History 
Dr. Nannapaneni Manga Devi is the Founder-Secretary of Sri Venkateswara Bala Kuteer and Chetana Charitable Trust.

Notable alumni

References

1965 establishments in Andhra Pradesh
Schools in Andhra Pradesh
Private schools in Andhra Pradesh
Schools in Guntur district
Educational institutions established in 1965